Francisco Clavet was the defending champion but lost in the first round to Andre Agassi.

Agassi won in the final 6–2, 7–6(7–2) against Juan Balcells.

Seeds

  Andre Agassi (champion)
  Tommy Haas (first round)
  Pete Sampras (second round)
  Guillermo Cañas (first round)
  Àlex Corretja (second round)
  Albert Portas (second round)
  Xavier Malisse (semifinals)
  Sjeng Schalken (first round)

Draw

Finals

Top half

Bottom half

External links
 Main draw

2002
2002 ATP Tour
2002 Tennis Channel Open